Enjoy CCCP is a compilation album by the Italian punk rock band CCCP Fedeli alla linea released by Virgin Records on 1994.

The cover is an imitation of the Coca-Cola brand. The name of the band is written in white color and uses the same font type of Coca-Cola on a Coca-Cola red background.

Track listing

Disc 1 - Danza 

 "Mi ami?"
 "Tomorrow (voulez-vous un rendez-vous)" (feat. Amanda Lear)
 "Le qualità della danza"
 "Amandoti"
 "Oh! Battagliero"
 "Huligani dangereux"
 "And the radio plays"
 "Annarella"
 "Guerra e pace"
 "Inch'Allah - ça va" (feat. Amanda Lear)
 "Fedele alla lira!"
 "Depressione Caspica"

Disc 2 - Militanza 

 "Militanz"
 "A ja ljublju SSSR" (Gimn sovetskogo sojuza)
 "Conviene"
 "Noia" (live Baveno, 1989)
 "Emilia paranoica"
 "Manifesto"
 "Palestina (15/11/1988)"
 "Madre"
 "Valium Tavor Serenase"
 "Spara Jurij"
 "CCCP"
 "Radio Kabul"

Personnel 

 Annarella Giudici - Benemerita soubrette, vocals
 Giovanni Lindo Ferretti - vocals
 Ignazio Orlando - bass, keyboards, drums
 Carlo Chiapparini - guitar
 Massimo Zamboni - guitar
 Danilo Fatur - Artista del popolo, vocals
 Silvia Bonvicini -  , vocals
 Umberto Negri - bass (1982-1985)

See also
 CCCP discography
 Consorzio Suonatori Indipendenti (C.S.I.)
 Per Grazia Ricevuta (PGR)
 Punk rock

References and footnotes 

CCCP Fedeli alla linea albums
1994 compilation albums
Virgin Records compilation albums
Italian-language albums